Mülenen is a railway station in the Swiss canton of Bern. The station is located on the Lötschberg line of the BLS AG, and is in the village of Mülenen. Both village and station are divided by the boundary between the municipalities of Reichenbach im Kandertal and Aeschi bei Spiez. The lower station of the Niesenbahn funicular, which provides a link to the summit of the Niesen mountain, is adjacent to the station.

Services 
The following services stop at Mülenen:

References

External links 
 
 

Railway stations in the canton of Bern
BLS railway stations